Rožňavské Bystré is a village and municipality in the Rožňava District in the Košice Region of middle-eastern Slovakia.

History
In historical records the village was first mentioned in 1318.

Geography
The village lies at an altitude of 402 metres and covers an area of 7.938 km².
It has a population of about 580 people.

Culture
The village has a public library and a football pitch.

External links

 Rožňavské Bystré
https://web.archive.org/web/20070513023228/http://www.statistics.sk/mosmis/eng/run.html
Official website of Rožňavské Bystré
https://www.e-obce.sk/obec/roznavskebystre/roznavske-bystre.html

Villages and municipalities in Rožňava District